Veras is a surname. Notable people with the surname include:

Darío Veras, Dominican Republic baseball player
José Veras (born 1980), Dominican Republic baseball player
Quilvio Veras (born 1971), Dominican Republic baseball player
Wilton Veras (born 1978), Dominican Republic baseball player
Zoska Veras (1892–1991), Belarusian writer

See also
Verás, the Spanish version of the 1995 Madonna song "You'll See"